Yessenia del Socorro Flores Rivas (born 7 July 1999) is a Nicaraguan footballer who plays as a midfielder for the Nicaragua women's national team.

During the 2022 CONCACAF W Championship qualification, Flores scored 6 goals in a 19–0 victory for Nicaragua against the Turks and Caicos Islands.

International goals
Scores and results list Nicaragua's goal tally first

Personal life
Flores' sister Sheyla also plays for the Nicaragua women's national football team.

References 

1999 births
Living people
Nicaraguan women's footballers
Women's association football midfielders
Nicaragua women's international footballers